The 1987–88 Ronchetti Cup was the 17th edition of FIBA's second-tier competition for European women's basketball clubs. It was contested by 34 teams from 17 countries (two more teams and three more countries than the previous edition), and ran from 23 September 1987 to 3 March 1988. Dynamo Kyiv defeated 100–83 previous year's runner-up Deborah Milano in the final, played in Athens, to become the sixth Soviet champion of the competition. It was the fourth edition in a row won by different Soviet teams. 4-times champion Spartak Leningrad and Slavia Prague also reached the semifinals.

First qualifying round

Second qualifying round

Group stage

Group A

Group B

Group C

Group D

Semifinals

Final

References

1987-88
1987–88 in European women's basketball